Dimmu Borgir is a Norwegian symphonic black metal band from Jessheim. Formed in 1993, the group was originally a trio which featured Sven Atle "Erkekjetter Silenoz" Kopperud on lead vocals and rhythm guitar, Ian Kenneth "Tjodalv" Åkesson on lead guitar, and Stian Tomt "Shagrath" Thoresen on drums. They were soon joined by bassist Ivar "Brynjard" Tristan and keyboardist Stian Aarstad. The band's current lineup is officially a trio comprising Shagrath on lead vocals, Silenoz on rhythm guitar and Tom Rune "Galder" Anderson on lead guitar (since 2000). They are joined by backup members Dariusz "Daray" Brzozowski on drums (since 2008), Geir "Gerlioz" Bratland on keyboards (since 2010) and Victor Brandt on bass (since 2018).

History

1993–1999
Silenoz, Tjodalv and Shagrath formed Dimmu Borgir in 1993, finalising the band's initial lineup with the addition of Tristan and Aarstad shortly thereafter. After the group released several early demos and its debut album For all tid, Tjodalv and Shagrath switched roles in the lineup. Shortly after the release of the band's second album Stormblåst, Tristan was replaced by Stian "Nagash" Hinderson for the recording of the Devil's Path EP. Enthrone Darkness Triumphant followed in early 1997, the tour for which saw the addition of Jamie "Astennu" Stinson on lead guitar.

During the tour in promotion of Enthrone Darkness Triumphant, Aarstad was fired from Dimmu Borgir after failing to show up for the band's performance at Dynamo Open Air in May 1997. He was temporarily replaced by Kimberly Goss, most recently of Therion, for the remainder of the cycle. Early the next year, Øyvind Johan "Mustis" Mustaparta took over full-time. After the recording of 1999's Spiritual Black Dimensions, both Tjodalv and Nagash left Dimmu Borgir. They were replaced on the subsequent tour by Nicholas Barker and Simen "ICS Vortex" Hestnæs, respectively.

1999–2007
At the end of 1999, Astennu was fired from Dimmu Borgir, which Barker claimed was due to his lack of interest in the band. He was replaced initially early the next year by Lars Archon, before Tom Rune "Galder" Anderson took over in the summer. The lineup of Shagrath, Galder, Silenoz, Vortex, Mustis and Barker remained stable for several years, releasing the albums Puritanical Euphoric Misanthropia, World Misanthropy and Death Cult Armageddon. In January 2004, Barker was dismissed from the band, which he suggested was likely due to the fact that he lived in a different country.

Despite an early rumour that Barker's place had been taken by Asgeir Mickelson, a bandmate of ICS Vortex's in Borknagar, it was announced in March that the new temporary touring drummer was Reno Kiilerich, most notably of Panzerchrist. After he was unable to obtain a US visa in time for the tour, the drummer was replaced for Ozzfest in the summer by Tony Laureano of Nile. Laureano remained for live shows the following summer, while Mayhem drummer Jan Axel "Hellhammer" Blomberg was brought in to record Stormblåst MMV as a guest session contributor.

Since 2007
Hellhammer continued working with Dimmu Borgir for the album In Sorte Diaboli and subsequent tour dates, although he never became an official band member. When he broke his arm in June 2007, he was replaced by the returning Tony Laureano. By October 2008, he had been replaced in the touring lineup by former Vader drummer Dariusz "Daray" Brzozowski. At the end of August 2009, long-term members ICS Vortex and Mustis were both dismissed. The remaining band members later claimed that the pair had displayed "unprofessionalism and bad live performances for years".

In 2010, Vortex and Mustis were replaced by Tommie "Snowy Shaw" Helgesson and Geir "Gerlioz" Bratland, respectively, although both were credited as guest performers (alongside Daray) and the band's frontman Shagrath confirmed that only he, Silenoz and Galder were official members of the group. Shaw left in August and was replaced on tour by Susperia frontman Terje "Cyrus" Andersen. He remained until May 2018, when he was replaced by Victor Brandt (of Firespawn and formerly of Entombed A.D.).

Members

Current

Former

Touring

Timelines

Members

Recording

Lineups

References

External links
Dimmu Borgir official website

Dimmu Borgir